Beigao Town is a town in Putian's Licheng District on the central coast of Fujian Province, China. It had 93,684 people in about 16,000 households during the 2010 census.

Geography
Beigao comprises part of the southern shore of Xinghua Bay on the Taiwan Strait and its hinterland. Its  form the southeastern corner of Putian's prefecture, bordering Houhai Lake and Quanzhou.

Administrative divisions
Beigao is composed of 24 villages: Kengyuan  Kēngyuán Cūn), Yuanhou  Yuànhòu Cūn),  Chengshan  Chéngshān Cūn),  Beigao  Běigāo Cūn),  Dongxiang  Dōngxiāng Cūn),  Houji  Hòujī Cūn),  Tingjiang  Tīngjiāng Cūn),  Tingfeng  Tīngfēng Cūn),  Jiangbian  Jiāngbiān Cūn),  Gaoyang  Gāoyáng Cūn),  Gaofeng  Gāofēng Cūn),  Lanshan  Lánshān Cūn),  Fuling  Fúlǐng Cūn),  Duling  Dùlǐng Cūn),  Wucheng  Wúchéng Cūn),  Shanqian  Shānqián Cūn),  Chengtou  Chéngtóu Cūn),  Chengqian  Chéngqián Cūn),  Qianting  Qiántíng Cūn),  Chongqin  Chōngqìn Cūn),  Donggao  Dōnggāo Cūn),  Zhuzhuang  Zhúzhuāng Cūn),  Meilan  Měilán Cūn), and Daifeng  Dàifēng Cūn). These oversee 128 zìráncūn and 248 cūnmín xiǎozǔ.

References

Township-level divisions of Fujian